Dorithia semicirculana is a species of moth of the family Tortricidae. It is found in the United States, where it has been recorded from Arizona, Colorado, New Mexico and Utah.

The wingspan is 18 mm.

References

Moths described in 1882
Euliini